Modoc is an unincorporated community in Athens County, Ohio, United States. Modoc is located on Ohio State Route 685 east of Buchtel.

A post office called Modoc was established in 1901, and remained in operation until 1906. A 2003 local newspaper report described it as "almost forgotten".

References

Unincorporated communities in Athens County, Ohio
Unincorporated communities in Ohio
1901 establishments in Ohio